Bakırköy Synagogue is a synagogue in Bakırköy, Istanbul, Turkey active since the late 19th century for the Jews of the area.  Because of a decrease in the Jewish population in the area it is now only open for Shabbat services.

See also
 History of the Jews in Turkey
 List of synagogues in Turkey

References and notes

External links
 Chief Rabbinate of Turkey
 Shalom Newspaper - The main Jewish newspaper in Turkey

Synagogues in Istanbul
Bakırköy